The 1890 Vermont gubernatorial election took place on September 2, 1890. Incumbent Republican William P. Dillingham, per the "Mountain Rule", did not run for re-election to a second term as Governor of Vermont. Republican candidate Carroll S. Page defeated Democratic candidate Herbert F. Brigham to succeed him.

Results

References

Vermont
1890
Gubernatorial
September 1890 events